The Doncaster Round Barn, also called "Bayers' Barn" and "the Round Barn at Twin Bridges" is a three-story, wood-framed round barn located about  north of Twin Bridges, Montana.  Built about 1882 by mining entrepreneur Noah Armstrong to house his race horses, and featuring a -wide indoor circular aisle that was used for exercising horses, it is a National Register of Historic Places property notable for its unique architecture and as the birthplace of the Thoroughbred racehorse, Spokane, winner of the 1889 Kentucky Derby.

Background
Armstrong had made his fortune in mining, and at one time operated the Hecla Consolidated Mining Company near Glendale, Montana.  During that time, he organized horse races in the mining camp, and after leaving the business he obtained property in the Jefferson River valley, near Twin Bridges, and began to raise race horses. He bought the original property from his son, and purchased additional surrounding land until he owned , which he originally named the Doncaster Farm, in honor of the famed English Thoroughbred race horse Doncaster, whom Armstrong admired.  The property had previously been called the Jefferson River Ranch.

Design
The barn was built in 1882 in accordance with a design by Armstrong and is believed to have been built by local craftsmen from area materials. It was three stories high, shaped like a "wedding cake," with each floor smaller than the one below it.

Armstrong stated they were driven twelve feet below the water table and set on bedrock. The walls were of wooden planks, made of three thicknesses of lumber deep, said to be insulated with "double sheets of building paper" between each layer of lumber. The entrance to the barn originally featured an engraved  horse scene placed over the door.

Horses normally kept outside could be sheltered there in bad weather. There were 26 box stalls on the first floor, around the outside of the track, with dividing walls only four feet high between the stalls so the horses could see one another, as Armstrong believed that "this promotion of neighborly companionship greatly [relieved] the monotony of indoor horse life." Each stall included a doorway to the outside and a window. The doorways led to 26 paddocks, one for each horse, covering . A circular structure in the center contained the tack room, two hospital stalls, and a spiral stairway. There was also an “elevator” for moving hay and grain, and a well shaft was sunk in the center of the barn, which, with the aid of a windmill on a  tower at the top of the barn, drew water that was stored in an  tank on the third floor. The first floors also included office space and sleeping quarters for staff. The second floor was claimed to hold up to 50 tons of hay and 12,000 bushels of grain. The floor sloped and chutes were cut into the floor so that feed could be easily deposited into the mangers of the horse stalls below. Water from the third floor tank went through a gravity-based plumbing system to each horse's stall.

Charles Armstrong, Noah's son, said the barn "may truly be called a model of architectural beauty and convenience.  This structure is so novel in its conception, so convenient in its economy, and withal so admirably adapted to the purposes of its creation, that a description of it cannot but be of interest to the readers of this sketch."

Operation and ownership

Armstrong believed that Montana's high altitude and the nutrient-rich farmland along the Jefferson River made the location ideal for raising superior racehorses.  He owned horses that raced at major US tracks, including a horse, Lord Raglan, who finished third in the 1883 Kentucky Derby. In 1885 or 1886, bought the mare Interpose, in foal, and shipped her to Montana. Her foal, Armstrong's chestnut race horse, Spokane, was foaled in the barn in 1886, and the horse's early training was on the barn's indoor track. After being shipped east at age 2 for race training, Spokane  won the Kentucky Derby in 1889, defeating the favorite, then went on to win other major eastern races. Although popular legend states he returned to Montana, there is not evidence that he did so.  He was advertised as standing at stud in Kentucky.

The Panic of 1893 caused financial hardship for the Doncaster operation.  Armstrong sold the ranch to Max Lauterbach and left Montana in 1900. From there, the barn was owned by a number of different people, and fell into disrepair until purchased by the Bayers family, who owned the Doncaster Farm property from 1933 until 1997. Arthur and Elizabeth Bayers raised Hereford cattle and were major breeders who sold their stock all over North America and held a cattle sale every year in the barn.  Their son, Byron Bayers, estimated that their cattle sales over the years topped $5 million. The barn's upkeep was very expensive, particularly the cost of red paint.

The Bayers sold the parcel of land where the barn sat in 1985, and it again fall into disrepair. In 1997, it was purchased by real estate developer and local rancher named  Allan Hamilton, who began to renovate the building.  He had a new roof put on the building and re-leveled the foundation.   In 2010, the property was purchased by Tony and Amie James.  They formed Swift River investments, a Massachusetts-based business, and began to renovate the structure into a community center.  Though "everyone" thought it had been listed on the National Register of Historic Places, no one had done so.  In January 2015, the Montana Historic Preservation Board met and unanimously agreed to nominate it.  The structure was placed on the NRHP on April 14, 2015.

The building was a Montana Cowboy Hall of Fame Legacy Award Inductee in 2008. The Jameses had been willing to donate the building to house the Montana Cowboy Hall of Fame itself, but a location in Big Timber, Montana was ultimately selected.

Notes

References

External links

Barns on the National Register of Historic Places in Montana
Round barns in Montana
Pre-statehood history of Montana
National Register of Historic Places in Madison County, Montana
1882 establishments in Montana Territory
Buildings and structures completed in 1882